Syed Zulfiqar Ali Bokhari (died 4 January 2019) was a Pakistani politician and diplomat who was the Chairman of the Pakistan Cricket Board (PCB) between 1995 and 1998. He also served an ambassador of Pakistan to Spain.

He was educated at the Aitchison College and was twice elected to the member of the National Assembly of Pakistan.

He was a brother of former Senator Syed Iftikhar Ali Bokhari.

References

Year of birth missing
Place of death missing
Place of birth missing
2019 deaths
Pakistan Cricket Board Presidents and Chairmen
Ambassadors of Pakistan to Spain
Aitchison College alumni
Members of the National Assembly of Pakistan